Lepelsky Uyezd (Лепельский уезд) was one of the subdivisions of the Vitebsk Governorate of the Russian Empire. It was situated in the southern part of the governorate. Its administrative centre was Lepiel (Lepel).

Demographics
At the time of the Russian Empire Census of 1897, Lepelsky Uyezd had a population of 156,706. Of these, 82.0% spoke Belarusian, 11.6% Yiddish, 4.0% Polish, 1.7% Russian, 0.5% Latvian, 0.2% Lithuanian and 0.1% German as their native language.

References

 
Uezds of Vitebsk Governorate